Rex Records may refer to:

 Rex Records (1912), a United States-based company
 Rex Records (1933), a United Kingdom-based company selling through Marks & Spencer department stores
 Rex Records (1957), a United States-based company in Holyoke, Massachusetts
 Rex Records (1965), a United Kingdom-based company established to serve the Irish market
 Rex Records (2001), a United Kingdom-based company

See also 
 R.E.X. Records